Saurogobio is a genus of cyprinid fish found in eastern Asia.

Species
There are currently 7 recognized species in this genus:
 Saurogobio dabryi Bleeker, 1871 (Chinese lizard gudgeon)
 Saurogobio dumerili Bleeker, 1871
 Saurogobio gracilicaudatus Yao & Yang, 1977 
 Saurogobio gymnocheilus Lo, Yao & Chen, 1998  
 Saurogobio immaculatus Koller, 1927
 Saurogobio lissilabris Bănărescu & Nalbant, 1973
 Saurogobio xiangjiangensis J. H. Tang, 1980

References

 
Fish of Asia